15th Annual GLAAD Media Awards (2004) were presented at three separate ceremonies: March 27 in Los Angeles; April 12 in New York City and June 5 in San Francisco. The awards were presented to honor "fair, accurate and inclusive" representations of gay individuals in the media.

Awards and nominees 
Winners are presented in bold.

Film Awards
Outstanding Film - Wide Release
Bend It Like Beckham 
Under the Tuscan Sun
Outstanding Film - Limited Release
Die, Mommie, Die! (Sundance Film Series)
Gasoline (Strand Releasing)
Madame Satã (Wellspring Media, Inc.)
Mambo Italiano (Samuel Goldwyn Films)
Yossi & Jagger (Strand Releasing)

Television Awards
 Outstanding Drama Series
 Degrassi: The Next Generation (The N)
 Nip/Tuck (FX)
 Playmakers (ESPN)
 Queer as Folk (Showtime)
 Six Feet Under (HBO)
 Outstanding Comedy Series
 It's All Relative (ABC)
 Oliver Beene (Fox)
 Reno 911! (Comedy Central)
 Sex and the City (HBO) 
 Will & Grace (NBC)
 Outstanding Individual Episode (in a series without a regular gay character)
 "A Time to Hate", Cold Case (CBS)
 "And Baby Makes Four", Girlfriends (UPN)
 "Chapter Fifty-Eight", Boston Public (Fox)
 "Fallacy", Law & Order: Special Victims Unit (NBC)
 "Sleeping Lions", The Brotherhood of Poland, New Hampshire (CBS)
 Outstanding Television Movie or Mini-Series
 Angels in America (HBO) 
 Cambridge Spies (BBC America)
 Normal (HBO)
 Soldier's Girl (Showtime)
 Tipping the Velvet (BBC America)
 Outstanding Reality Program
 The Amazing Race 4 (CBS)
 America's Next Top Model (UPN)
 Boy Meets Boy (Bravo)
 Queer Eye for the Straight Guy (Bravo)
 Real World/Road Rules Challenge: The Gauntlet (MTV)
 Outstanding Documentary
 A Boy Named Sue (Showtime)
 Brother Outsider: The Life of Bayard Rustin (PBS) 
 Daddy & Papa (PBS)
 Hope Along the Wind: The Life of Harry Hay (PBS)
 School's Out: The Life of a Gay High School in Texas (MTV)
 Outstanding Daily Drama
 All My Children (ABC) 
 Outstanding Talk Show
 "Alyn Libman", The Sharon Osbourne Show (syndicated)
 "The Husband Who Became a Woman", The Oprah Winfrey Show (syndicated) 
 Outstanding TV Journalism
 "The Death of Sakia Gunn", Live from the Headlines (CNN)
 "Father Raymond: A Question of Faith and Identity", Nightline (ABC)
 "It's in to Be 'Out'", 20/20 (ABC)
 "Not Fit to Fight", Primetime Thursday (ABC) (tie)
 "Up Close: The Killing of Gwen Araujo", KCAL 9 News (KCAL - Los Angeles) (tie)

Print
 Outstanding Magazine Article
 "Motherhood My Way" by Jacqueline Woodson, Essence
 "The New Face of Gay Power" by John Cloud, Time 
 "One of These Men Used to Be a She" by Nanette Varian, Glamour
 "Their True Selves" by Kade Collins and Samantha Lease as told to Stephanie Booth, Teen People
 "To Be Young, Gifted and Gay" by Farah Stockman, Honey
 Outstanding Magazine Overall Coverage
 The Nation
 National Catholic Reporter
 Newsweek 
 People
 Time
 Outstanding Newspaper Article
 "Angels, Reagan and AIDS in America" by Frank Rich (The New York Times)
 "For Gays, Secrecy in Love, War" by Patricia Ward Biederman (Los Angeles Times)
 "Gays Feel Left Out of Morehouse Brotherhood" by Craig Seymour (The Atlanta Journal-Constitution)
 "Same-Sex Unions Move Center Stage" by David Von Drehle (The Washington Post)
 "Straddling Sexes" by Louise Rafkin (San Francisco Chronicle)
 Outstanding Newspaper Columnist
 Dave Ford (San Francisco Chronicle)
 Ellen Goodman (The Boston Globe)
 Ed Gray (Boston Herald)
 Leonard Pitts, Jr. (The Miami Herald)
 Deb Price (The Detroit News)
 Outstanding Newspaper Overall Coverage
 The Boston Globe
 Chicago Tribune
 The New York Times
 San Francisco Chronicle
 USA Today
 Outstanding Advertising - Print
 "Absolut Out." - Absolut 
 "R You Ready to Adopt a New Lifestyle?" - Chereskin
 Outstanding Comic Book
 The Authority (Wildstorm/DC Comics)
 Catwoman (DC Comics)
 Gotham Central (DC Comics)
 How Loathsome (NBM Publishing)
 Strangers in Paradise (Abstract Studio)

Digital
 Outstanding Digital Journalism Article
 "Abuse and Neglect" by David Tuller, Salon.com
 "Lives Less Ordinary" by Bryan Robinson, ABC News.com
 "Out at the Prom" by Julie Scelfo, Newsweek/MSNBC.com
 "Out of Step" by Martha Brant, Newsweek/MSNBC.com
 "Same-Sex Family Values" by Laura McClure, Salon.com
 Outstanding Advertising - Electronic
 Hotel Matrix - Orbitz
 "Marco: Independence" - The N
 "Wedding" - Snapple
Outstanding Digital Journalism Article (Spanish-language)
"Homosexuales: realidades y prejuicios" by Grace Fuller, CNNenespañol.com
"Una decisión que puede sentar un precedente para el resto de EE.UU." by Grace Fuller, CNNenespañol.com
"Victoria para matrimonios del mismo sexo" by Emilio Guerra, Univision.com

Music & Theater
 Outstanding Music Artist
 Bitch and Animal, Sour Juice and Rhyme
 Junior Senior, D-D-Don't Don't Stop the Beat
 Meshell Ndegeocello, Comfort Woman
 Peaches, Fatherfucker
 Rufus Wainwright, Want One
 Outstanding Los Angeles Theater
 Autumn Canticle
 Blues for an Alabama Sky
 Body of Faith
 Miss Coco Peru is Undaunted 
 Naked Will: The Portrait of W.H.
 Outstanding New York Theater: Broadway and Off-Broadway
 Avenue Q
 Flesh and Blood
 I Am My Own Wife 
 The Last Sunday in June
 Taboo
 Outstanding New York Theater: Off-Off-Broadway
 Auntie Mayhem
 Bernadette and the Butcher of Broadway
 Marga Gomez's Intimate Details
 Say You Love Satan
 To My Chagrin

Special Recognition Awards
Vanguard Award - Antonio Banderas
Davidson/Valentini Award - Clive Barker
Vito Russo Award - Cherry Jones
Excellence in Media Award - Julianne Moore
Golden Gate Award - Megan Mullally
Stephen F. Kolzak Award - John Waters
Barbara Gittings Award - In the Life
Favorite OUT Image of the Year - All My Children
Special Recognition: Off the Roof (Mun2)
Special Recognition: Gavin Newsom

Sponsors
Presenting Sponsor: Absolut Vodka
Platinum Underwriters: Wells Fargo, IBM
Underwriters: Anheuser-Busch, Banana Republic, Coors, Jaguar Cars, Land Rover, Lehman Brothers, Motorola, The Michael Palm Foundation, Terry K. Watanbe
Gold Patrons: Autonomy, Blockbuster, HBO, MTV Networks, Perrier, PlanetOut, Prudential Financial, Rancho Zabaco, Showtime, Starbucks, Time Warner, Tylenol PM
Patrons: The Advocate/Out, AT&T, Bravo, William Q. Derrough and Alvaro G. Salas - Jefferies & Co., Inc., Eastman Kodak, Fox Entertainment Group, The Honorable Michael Huffington, Le Montrose Suite Hotel, Barbara & Garry Marshall, The McGraw-Hill Companies, McKinsey & Company - Media & Entertainment Practice, New Line Cinema / Fine Line Features, Paramount Pictures, Polo Ralph Lauren, Prime Access, Daniel H. Renberg, Andrew Tobias & Charles Nolan, Verizon, Steven Victorin & Neil Parker, Weil, Gotshal & Manges, LLP
Sponsors: ABC News, American Express Company, AON / Albert G. Ruben Insurance Services Inc., Bloomberg, BrownCo. a brokerage service of J.P. Morgan, LLC, Burson-Marsteller, Carsey Werner Mandabach, CBS/UPN, Creative Artists Agency, Daily Variety, Deloitte, Entertainment Partners, Fuse, Gay Channel by MTV Networks, Rufus Gifford & Russell Bennett, Gibbons, Del Deo, Dolan, Griffinger & Vecchione, Heineken USA, The Hollywood Reporter, HSBC Bank USA, InStyle, Leslie, Engell & Associates, LLP, Levi Strauss & Company, Lifetime, Microsoft, Miramax Films, Paramount Pictures, People en Español, People, Tony Phelps & Luxe Limousine World Wide Transportation Service, Rhino/Warner Strategic Marketing, Ted Snowdon, Sundance Channel, Time Inc., Time, UBS, Univision Communications, The Walt Disney Company, Warner Bros. Records, Marc Wolinsky & Barry Skovgaard, Yahoo!, The York Hotel
Special Thanks: American Airlines

External links
15th Annual GLAAD Media Awards
GLAAD Website

15th
2004 awards
2004 in LGBT history
Lists of LGBT-related award winners and nominees